Jerome "Jerry" Gershwin (April 20, 1926 – September 17, 1997) was an American film producer. He was best known for his long collaboration with Elliott Kastner. His credits include Where Eagles Dare (1968) and Harper (1966). He was a member of the Academy of Motion Pictures Arts & Sciences.

Gershwin was born in New York City. He died at the age of 71 in Los Angeles, California from leukemia.

Partial filmography
 Bound By Honor (1993)
 Nomads (1986)
 Breakheart Pass (1975)
 Your Three Minutes Are Up (1973)
 When Eight Bells Toll (1971)
 A Severed Head (1970)
 The Walking Stick (1970)
 Tam-Lin (1970)
 The Night of the Following Day (1968)
 Where Eagles Dare (1968)
 Harper (1966)

References

External links

1926 births
1997 deaths
Deaths from leukemia
Film producers from New York (state)
Businesspeople from New York City
20th-century American businesspeople